Moxley & Co. LLC is the nominee of JPMorgan Chase Bank, National Association which is the depositary for holders of some Japanese and Taiwanese companies' American Depositary Receipts (ADRs).

ADRs issued by JPMorgan (ratio of ADR to total shares)
Sony 6.7% as of March 2012
Tokio Marine Holdings 1.5% as of March 2012
Panasonic 2.36% as of March 2012
Honda Motor 3.4% as of March 2012
Canon 2.9%  as of June 2012
Nippon Telegraph and Telephone (NTT) 1.78% as of March 2012
Chi Mei Optoelectronics .96% as of April 2004

JPMorgan Chase